André Velter (born 1945), French poet, was born in Signy-l'Abbaye in the Ardennes région and was educated in Charleville and Paris. Having begun his first journeys in 1955 through Europe and the Middle East, he has traveled through Afghanistan, Tibet, China and India. As a result, his poetry displays a varied and colorful relation to the places, sounds and rhythms of the cultures he has visited.

Velter has experimented with improvised songs, polyphonic poetry, and has composed a rock oratorio. His work with France Culture combined with frequent poetry recitals, alone or with dance and instrumentation, show commitment to poetry as an actively performed medium.

His work has been translated into many languages and is also available on compact disc.

Awards
1996 Prix Goncourt
1990 Mallarmé prize

Selected bibliography
Aisha, Gallimard, 1966
Du Gange à Zanzibar, Gallimard, 1993 (Louise Labé prize)
Les poètes du chat noir (Anthology), Gallimard, 1996
L'Arbre seul, Gallimard, 1998 (Mallarmé prize)
L'Amour extrême, Gallimard, 2000
Songs of Love and War: Afghan Women's Poetry, ed. Sayd Majrouh, Other Press, 2003
La Faute à qui, CD Elios Productions and les Editions Thélème, 2004
Zingaro suite équestre et un piaffer plus dans l'inconnu, Gallimard, 2005

External links

 Official site

1945 births
Living people
French poets
Veletr, Andre
People from Ardennes (department)
French male poets
Radio France people